Cecile Believe (formerly known as Mozart's Sister) is a solo project by Montreal-based Canadian musician Caila Thompson-Hannant.

Biography
Thompson-Hannant's musical beginnings are much accredited to the electropop introduced to her by her uncle. She went on to play guitar & synthesizer in the band Shapes & Sizes, which was on the Asthmatic Kitty label. She was also a member of Montreal-based bands Miracle Fortress and Think About Life.

Thompson-Hannant independently released her first EP, Dear Fear, in 2011 through Bandcamp. For the two years following this release, she garnered press attention through playing festivals such as SXSW and Pop Montreal. In February 2013 she released her second EP, Hello, through Merok Records. In June 2014 she announced a new album, titled Being, for release on August 5 of that year and released the single "Enjoy". She thereafter released her second album, Field of Love, on February 17, 2017.

Thompson-Hannant performed vocals on "Definitely Come Together" by Kane West in May 2017 and co-wrote and recorded vocals for many songs on Oil Of Every Pearl's Un-Insides, the 2018 album by the producer Sophie, including performing back-up vocals for the lead single "It's Okay To Cry" (released on October 19, 2017) and lead vocals for the album's following singles, "Ponyboy" and "Faceshopping" (additionally co-writing the latter song). Around this same time, Thompson-Hannant also recorded backing vocals for Kero Kero Bonito's TOTEP as well as changed the name of all of her social media accounts to Cecile Believe.

On February 18, 2020, Thompson-Hannant released her first solo single under the Cecile Believe moniker, titled "Last Thing He Said To Me In Person", accompanied by its music video and a pre-order of her album Made In Heaven on which it appears. Her second single, titled "Pick Up The Phone", was released on April 8, 2020 along with a music video that was released a day before the official release. Her debut album, "Made In Heaven", was officially released a month later on May 8, 2020. The album was completely written, produced and performed by herself.

On November 20, 2020, she released her mixtape, Plucking a Cherry From The Void, which included the single, "Times", that was officially released prior on November 12, 2020 along with a visualizer video the same day. The mixtape features additional production from PC Music founder A. G. Cook on two tracks ("Crickets" and "Living My Life Over (Extreme Vocal Edit)"). Thompson-Hannant also appeared on Cook's 7G album in 2020.

In 2021, Thompson-Hannant was revealed to be working on SSION's latest album. She also participated in a writing camp for Dorian Electra's next project.

Discography

As Cecile Believe 

 Made in Heaven (Self-released, 2020)
 Plucking a Cherry from the Void (Self-released, 2020)

As Mozart's Sister

EPs
Dear Fear (Self-released, 2011)
Hello (Merok, 2013)

Albums
Being (Asthmatic Kitty, 2014)
Field of Love (Arbutus, 2017)

Guest appearances

References

External links
Windish Agency
Asthmatic Kitty Records

Musical groups from Montreal
Canadian women singers
Asthmatic Kitty artists
Arbutus Records artists